Sylvio Lazzari (born Josef Fortunat Silvester Lazzari) (30 December 1857 – 10 June 1944) was a French composer of Austrian and italian origin.

Life
Born in Bolzano – then part of the Austro-Hungarian Empire – , Lazzari came to Paris in 1882 after studying law in Austria. At the Paris Conservatory, he studied under Ernest Guiraud and César Franck. Encouraged by Ernest Chausson and Franck, Lazzari settled permanently in France and obtained French citizenship in 1896. He held several official positions in Paris, including president of the Wagner Society (from 1894) and choirmaster at the Opéra de Monte-Carlo. Because of dwindling eyesight, he later focused on composition only.

Lazzari's use of cyclic structures was indebted to Franck; he was also heavily influenced by Wagner (especially in his operas) and the impressionists. His best-known opera, La Lépreuse (first performed in 1912), was highly praised for its musical content, but frequently criticised for its naturalistic libretto. Three of his operas, including La Lépreuse, are inspired by Brittany, with Breton plots, also using Breton folksongs as local colour.

Very few of his compositions have been performed since his death, but some of his chamber music is occasionally revived. Lazzari died in Suresnes, near Paris.

Works

Orchestra
Marche pour une fête joyeuse (1903)
Effet de Nuit (1904)
Concertstück, Op. 18, piano and orchestra (1887, rev. 1894)
Symphony in E-flat major (1907)
Rapsodie, for violin and orchestra (1922)
Suite in F major, Op. 23 (1922)
Faust (incidental music, after Goethe) (1925)
Au bois de Misère (1925)

Salon orchestra
Perdu en mer (1926)
Escualdune (Visions basques) (1927)
Fête bretonne (1927)
La Chanson du moulin (1928)
Cortège nocturne (1929)

Chamber music
Piano trio, Op. 13 (1889)
String Quartet, Op. 17a (1888)
Octet, Op. 20, for flute, oboe, clarinet, English horn, 2 bassoons, 2 horns (1889)
Violin Sonata, Op. 24 (1894)
Barcarolle, for cello and piano (1912)
Scherzo, for violin and piano (1931)

Piano
Valse brillante, Op. 4 (1884)
Valses caractéristiques (1888)
Suite, Op. 14 (1891)
3 Pièces, Op. 16 (1892)
2 Miniatures (1895)
Petite esquisse (1903)
Rapsodie hongroise, 4 hands (1903)
Romanzetta (1923)
Cordace (Danse grecque)(1925)

Orchestral songs
2 Poèmes (M. Dumont, P. Verlaine), Op. 30 (1901) (S. Mallarmé, 1903)
Le Cavalier d'Olmedo (after L. de Vega) (1918)
Le Nouveau Christ (H. Bataille) (1918), baritone
La Fontaine de pitié (Bataille) (1920)

Songs
More than 50 songs, among other:
Vieux motif (L. B.) (1884)
L'Amour d'après Ninette (G. Richard) (1887)
À l'absente (P. Verlaine, J. Lahor, anon.), 6 songs (1892)
L'Oiseau; Au printemps; La Jeune fille et la rose (Lazzari), 4 voices (1893)
3 Mélodies (P. Verlaine, L. Bowitsch, L. Benedite), Op. 19 (1894)
L'Automne (A. de Lamartine), 3 voices, piano ad lib (1894)
3 Duos (Lazzari), Op. 21, Soprano, Baritone (1894)
2 Poèmes (M. Dumont, P. Verlaine), Op. 30 (1901)
3 Poésies d'E. Blémont d'après H. Heine (1906)
Le Cavalier d'Olmedo (after L. de Vega) (1918)
Le Nouveau Christ (H. Bataille) (1918)
La Fontaine de pitié (Bataille) (1920)

Operas
Armor (Ernest Jaubert), 3 acts (1896), first performed Prague, 7 November 1898
La Lépreuse, subt. tragédie légendaire (Henry Bataille), 3 acts (1896), first performed Paris, 7 February 1912
Melaenis (Georges Spitzmüller), 5 acts (1907), first performed Mühlhausen, 25 March 1927
Le Sauteriot (Henri Pierre Roché, Martial Périer, after E. von Keyserling), 3 acts (1915), first performed Chicago, 19 January 1918
La Tour de feu (Lazzari), 3 acts (1925), first performed Paris, 28 January 1928

References

Bibliography
Don Randel (ed.): The Harvard Biographical Dictionary of Music (Harvard, 1996), p. 489.
Sebastian Werr: "Lazzari, Sylvio", in: Die Musik in Geschichte und Gegenwart (MGG), biographical part vol. 10 (Kassel: Bärenreiter & Stuttgart: Metzler, 2003), 1380–1381.

External links
 

1857 births
1944 deaths
Conservatoire de Paris alumni
French classical composers
French male classical composers
French male composers
French people of Austrian descent
Naturalized citizens of France
Musicians from Bolzano